Ammameh Castle Or Maziar Castle is a historical castle located in Ammameh village, Shemiranat County, Tehran Province, Iran. The longevity of this fortress dates back to the Ziyarid dynasty.

References 

Castles in Iran